Gateford  is an estate in Nottinghamshire, England. It is located 1 mile north-west of Worksop. Since 1995 radical changes have developed in Gateford, such as the Celtic Point shopping centre and the Ashes Park Avenue estate. Gateford also has a primary school called Gateford Park Primary School. Gateford Hall is a medieval moated manor house, altered in the 17th century. In its history, Gateford was a sand quarry, which has all but disappeared in the modern day.

References

Villages in Nottinghamshire
Bassetlaw District